The Second World War is a history of the period from the end of the First World War to July 1945, written by Winston Churchill. Churchill labelled the "moral of the work" as follows: "In War: Resolution, In Defeat: Defiance, In Victory: Magnanimity, In Peace: Goodwill".

Churchill wrote the book, with a team of assistants, using both his own notes and privileged access to official documents while still working as a politician; the text was vetted by the Cabinet Secretary. Churchill was largely fair in his treatment, but wrote the history from his personal point of view. He was unable to reveal all the facts, as some, such as the use of Ultra electronic intelligence, had to remain secret. From a historical point of view the book is therefore an incomplete memoir by a leading participant in the direction of the war.

The book was a major commercial success in Britain and the United States. The first edition appeared in six volumes; later editions appeared in twelve and four volumes, and furthermore there is also a single-volume abridged version.

Writing

When Churchill assumed office in 1940, he intended to write a history of the war then beginning.  He said several times: "I will leave judgements on this matter to history—but I will be one of the historians." To circumvent the rules against the use of official documents, he took the precaution throughout the war of having a weekly summary of correspondence, minutes, memoranda and other documents printed in galleys and headed "Prime Minister's personal minutes". These were then stored at his home and Churchill wrote or dictated letters and memoranda with the intention of placing his views on the record, for later use as a historian. The arrangements became a source of controversy when The Second World War began appearing in 1948. Churchill was a politician, not an academic historian and was Leader of the Opposition, intending to return to office, so Churchill's access to Cabinet, military and diplomatic records denied to other historians was questioned.

It was not known at the time that Churchill had done a deal with Clement Attlee and the Labour government which came to office in 1945. Attlee agreed to allow Churchill's research assistants access to all documents, provided that no official secrets were revealed, the documents were not used for party political purposes and the typescript was vetted by the Cabinet Secretary, Sir Norman Brook. Brook took a close interest in the books and rewrote some sections to ensure that British interests were not harmed or the government embarrassed. Churchill's privileged access to documents and his knowledge gave him an advantage over other historians of the Second World War for many years. The books had enormous sales in both Britain and the United States and made Churchill a rich man for the first time. The gathered documents were placed in chronologies by his advisers, and this store of material was further supplemented by dictated recollections of key episodes, together with queries about chronology, location and personalities for his team to resolve. Churchill also wrote to many fellow actors requesting documents and comments. Once all was collected and collated, Churchill began writing in earnest, dictating almost all of the work, with the notable exception of several long passages in Volume I.

As various archives have been opened, several deficiencies of the work have become apparent.  Some of these are inherent in the position Churchill occupied as a former prime minister and a serving politician.  He could not reveal ongoing military secrets, such as the work of the code breakers at Bletchley Park, or the planning of the atomic bomb. As stated in the author's introduction, the book concentrates on the British war effort. Other theatres of war are described largely as a background. The descriptions of the fighting on the Eastern Front and to a lesser extent, of the Pacific War are sketchy.  Although he is usually fair, some personal vendettas are aired, for example against Sir Stafford Cripps, at one time considered by some the "only possible alternative wartime Prime Minister" to Churchill. He modified a number of passages when he learnt that General Dwight Eisenhower was to run for the US presidency, removing any remarks which might harm the "special relationship" which he intended to establish (or re-establish) with the new president.

Legacy

The Second World War can be read by students of the period as a memoir by a leading participant, rather than a comprehensive history by a professional and detached historian. The Second World War, particularly the period from  when Britain fought with the support of the Empire and a few Allies, was the climax of Churchill's career and his inside story of those days is unique and invaluable.

American historian Raymond Callahan, reviewing In Command of History by David Reynolds about Churchill's The Second World War, wrote:

Callahan concluded that notwithstanding any changes to historians' understanding of the book, now that what Churchill wrote has been compared in detail to the released archives, Churchill "remains the arresting figure he has always been—dynamic, often wrong, but the indispensable leader" who led Britain to "its last, terribly costly, imperial victory." In Callahan's view, Churchill was guilty of "carefully reconstructing the story" to suit his postwar political goals.

John Keegan wrote in the 1985 introduction to the series that some deficiencies in the account stem from the secrecy of Ultra intelligence. Keegan held that Churchill's account was unique, since none of the other leaders (Franklin D. Roosevelt, Harry S. Truman, Benito Mussolini, Joseph Stalin, Adolf Hitler, Hideki Tojo) wrote a firsthand account of the war. Churchill's books were written collaboratively, as he solicited others involved in the war for their papers and remembrances.

Editions 
The Second World War has been issued in editions of six, twelve and four volumes, as well as a single-volume abridgment. Some volumes in these editions share names, such as Triumph and Tragedy, but the contents of the volumes differ, covering varying portions of the book.

The country of first publication was the United States, preceding publication in the United Kingdom by six months. This was a consequence of the many last minute changes which Churchill insisted be made to the London Cassell edition, which he considered to be definitive.

 First edition (hardcover) in six volumes
 The Gathering Storm (1948)
 Their Finest Hour (1949)
 The Grand Alliance (1950)
 The Hinge of Fate (1950)
 Closing the Ring (1951)
 Triumph and Tragedy (1953)

 Full paperback edition in twelve volumes
 The Gathering Storm
 The Twilight War
 The Fall of France
 The Commonwealth Alone
 Germany Drives East
 War Comes to America
 The Onslaught of Japan
 Victory in Africa
 The Invasion of Italy
 Assault from the Air
 The Tide of Victory
 Triumph and Tragedy

 Condensed edition in four volumes
 Milestones to Disaster
 Alone
 The Grand Alliance
 Triumph and Tragedy

See also 
 History of the Second World War, the official history by the British government

General bibliography

Citations

External links
 
 
 

1948 non-fiction books
1949 non-fiction books
1950 non-fiction books
1951 non-fiction books
1953 non-fiction books
Books by Winston Churchill
Book series introduced in 1948
English non-fiction literature
History books about the United Kingdom
Series of history books about World War II
Books written by prime ministers of the United Kingdom

Quotes (see winston Churchill wikiquote)